Nort-sur-Erdre (literally Nort on Erdre) is a commune in the Loire-Atlantique department in western France. It is on the river Erdre north of Nantes.

Population

See also
Communes of the Loire-Atlantique department
Jean Fréour

References

Communes of Loire-Atlantique